Following is a list of Nobel laureates who are either Pakistani or were born in the region that is now Pakistan but are not Pakistani by nationality.

Laureates

Pakistani citizens 
, the list of Pakistani Nobel laureates consists of following people.

Nobel laureates born in region that later become Pakistan 
The laureates below were born in the part of the British Raj that became Pakistan, but immigrated before independence and are not Pakistani by nationality.

References 

Nobel laureates
Pakistani